Parchin (also Romanized as Pārchīn; also known as Pāreh Chīn) is a village in Yurchi-ye Sharqi Rural District, Kuraim District, Nir County, Ardabil Province, Iran. At the 2006 census, its population was 95, in 17 families.

References 

Towns and villages in Nir County